The 2020 Norwegian Women's Cup was the 43rd season of the Norwegian annual knock-out football tournament. It began on 30 September 2020, severely belated due to the COVID-19 pandemic in Norway. Also, the cup was open to clubs in the first two tiers only. The clubs of the 2020 Toppserien entered in the first round, whereas the rest of the clubs in the 2020 1. divisjon contested a preliminary round.

Preliminary round

|colspan="3" style="background-color:#97DEFF"|30 September 2020

{{OneLegResult| Åsane || 1–2 | Hønefoss }}

|}

First round

|colspan="3" style="background-color:#97DEFF"|6 October 2020|-
|colspan="3" style="background-color:#97DEFF"|7 October 2020|}

Quarter-finals

|colspan="3" style="background-color:#97DEFF"|10 November 2020|-
|colspan="3" style="background-color:#97DEFF"|11 November 2020|}

Semi-finals

|colspan="3" style="background-color:#97DEFF"|21 November 2020|-
|colspan="3" style="background-color:#97DEFF"|22 November 2020'''

|}

Final

References

Norwegian Women's Cup seasons
Norwegian Women's Cup
Cup
Norwegian Women's Cup, 2020